Psychostrophia picaria is a moth in the family Epicopeiidae. It was described by John Henry Leech in 1897. It is found in China.

The forewings have a single large light area in the form of a creamy oblique band that reaches the inner margin. The hindwings have a broad, transverse, medial black band.

References

Moths described in 1897
Epicopeiidae